George Bell Jr. (1859–1926) was a United States Army major general during World War I. General Bell may also refer to:

Burwell B. Bell III (born 1947), U.S. Army four-star general
Chris Bell (British Army officer) (fl. 2000s–2020s), British Army major general
Edward Wells Bell (c. 1789–1870), British Army general
George Bell (brigadier general) (1828–1907), U.S. Army brigadier general in the American Civil War
George Bell (British Army officer) (1794–1877), Irish general in the British Army
George Gray Bell (1920–2000), Canadian Army brigadier general
George Bell Jr. (1859–1926), U.S. Army major general
J. Franklin Bell (1856–1919), U.S. Army major general
James Martin Bell (1796–1849), Ohio Militia major general
John Bell (British Army officer) (1782–1876), British Army general
John Bell (Ohio politician) (1796–1869), Ohio Militia major general
Sherman Bell (fl. 1900s–1910s), Adjutant General of the Colorado National Guard
Tyree H. Bell (1815–1902), Confederate States Army brigadier general

See also
Attorney General Bell (disambiguation)